Helen Peralta (born July 10, 1988) is a Dominican mixed martial artist currently competing in the flyweight division of Invicta Fighting Championships.

Background 
Peralta started mixed martial arts training after understanding she would be fighting people without legal consequences instead of getting herself into trouble.

Mixed martial arts career

Invicta Fighting Championships 

Peralta made her Invicta debut on January 13 2018 against Jade Ripley at Invicta FC 27: Kaufman vs. Kianzad. She won the fight via technical knockout in round one.

Her second fight in Invicta was set on May 4, 2018 at Invicta FC 29: Kaufman vs. Lehner against Cheyanne Vlismas. She won the fight via unanimous decision.

Peralta fight under Cage Fury Fighting Championships on September 1, 2018 facing Kay Hansen at Invicta FC 31: Jandiroba vs. Morandin. She lost the fight via technical knockout in round three.

After two fights in Invicta, Peralta fought Olympic boxer, Jennifer Chieng, at Invicta FC 42: Cummins vs. Zappitella on September 17, 2022. She won the fight via unanimous decision.

Cage Fury Fighting Championships 
On May 28, 2021, Peralta faced Laura Gallardo at Cage Fury Fighting Championships 96. She lost the fight via split decision.

Return to Invicta Fighting Championships 
Caitlin Sammons was the opponent she faced of her return to Invicta FC on August 27, 2021 at Invicta FC 44: A New Era. She won the fight via unanimous decision.

Peralta faced Elise Pone on January 12, 2022 at Invicta FC 45: Zappitella vs. Delboni II. She won the fight via unanimous decision.

Peralta was one of the contenders of The Ultimate Fighter 30 on 2022 installment of the Ultimate Fighting Championship (UFC)-produced reality television series The Ultimate Fighter on ESPN+ for the women's flyweights weight class.

Peralta faced Poliana Botelho at Invicta FC 49: Delboni vs. DeCoursey on September 28, 2022. She lost the bout via unanimous decision.

Legacy Fighting Alliance 
Peralta faced Aline Pereira at Legacy Fighting Alliance 147: Melo vs. Costa on November 18, 2022. Peralta won the fight via unanimous decision.

Professional Fighters League 
Peralta faced Lisa Mauldin on February 24, 2024 at  PFL Challenger Series 13, losing the bout via ground and pound TKO in the third round.

Mixed martial arts record 

|-
|Loss
|align=center|6–4 
|Lisa Mauldin
|TKO (punches)
|PFL Challenger Series 13
| 
|align=center|3
|align=center|3:51
|Orlando, Florida, United States
|
|-
|Win 
|align=center| 6–3
|Aline Pereira
|Decision (unanimous)
|LFA 147
|
|align=center|3
|align=center|5:00
|Sloan, Iowa, United States 
|
|-
|Loss
|align=center| 5–3 
|Poliana Botelho
|Decision (unanimous)
|Invicta FC 49: Delboni vs. DeCoursey
|
|align=center|3
|align=center|5:00
|Hinton, Oklahoma, United States
|
|-
|Win
|align=center| 5–2
|Elise Pone
|Decision (unanimous)
|Invicta FC 45: Zappitella vs. Delboni II
| 
|align=center|3
|align=center|5:00
|Kansas City, Missouri, United States
|
|-
|Win
|align=center| 4–2
|Caitlin Sammons
|Decision (unanimous)
|Invicta FC 44: A New Era
|
|align=center|3
|align=center|5:00
|Kansas City, Missouri, United States
|
|-
|Loss
|align=center| 3–2
|Laura Gallardo
|Decision (split)
|CFFC 96
|
|align=center|3
|align=center|5:00
|Philadelphia, Pennsylvania, United States
|
|-
|Win
|align=center| 3–1
|Jennifer Chieng
|Decision (unanimous)
|Invicta FC 42: Cummins vs. Zappitella
|
|align=center|3
|align=center|5:00
|Kansas City, Missouri, United States
|
|-
|Loss
|align=center|2–1
|Kay Hansen
|TKO (punches)
|Invicta FC 31: Jandiroba vs. Morandin
|
|align=center|3
|align=center|4:16
|Kansas City, Missouri, United States
|
|-
|Win
|align=center|2–0
|Cheyanne Vlismas
|Decision (unanimous)
|Invicta FC 29: Kaufman vs. Lehner
|
|align=center|3
|align=center|5:00
|Kansas City, Missouri, United States
|
|-
|Win
|align=center|1–0
|Jade Ripley
|TKO (punches)
|Invicta FC 27: Kaufman vs. Kianzad
|
|align=center|1
|align=center|2:22 
|Kansas City, Missouri, United States
|
|-

|-
| Loss
| align=center | 0–1
| Kaytlin Neil
| Decision (split)
| rowspan=1|The Ultimate Fighter: Team Peña vs. Team Nunes
|  (air date)
| align=center | 3
| align=center | 5:00
| rowspan=1|Las Vegas, Nevada, United States
|

Bare knuckle boxing record

|-
|Win
|align=center|2–0
|Maia Kahunaele
|KO (punches)
|BKFC 9: Lobov vs. Knight 2 
|
|align=center|1
|align=center|1:57
|Biloxi, Mississippi, United States
|
|-
|Win
|align=center|1–0
|Christine Ferea	
|Decision (unanimous)
|BKFC 7: Alers vs. Garcia
|
|align=center|5
|align=center|2:00
|Biloxi, Mississippi, United States
|
|-

See also 
 List of current Invicta FC fighters

References

External links
 
 Helen Peralta at Invicta FC

Living people
1988 births
Dominican Republic female mixed martial artists
Flyweight mixed martial artists
Mixed martial artists utilizing boxing
Mixed martial artists utilizing Brazilian jiu-jitsu
Dominican Republic practitioners of Brazilian jiu-jitsu
Female Brazilian jiu-jitsu practitioners
Dominican Republic women boxers
Bare-knuckle boxers